William James McGuire (February 17, 1925 in New York City, New York – December 21, 2007 in New Haven, Connecticut) was an American social psychologist known for his work on the psychology of persuasion and for developing Inoculation theory. He was a faculty member at Yale University from 1970 until he retired in 1999, and chaired the psychology department there from 1971 to 1973. He was the editor-in-chief of the Journal of Personality and Social Psychology from 1967 to 1970.

Legacy
An obituary of McGuire in American Psychologist stated that McGuire was "...for several decades the field’s premier researcher of the
psychology of persuasion".

References

External links
Remarks about McGuire by Mahzarin Banaji at the 1998 Society of Experimental Social Psychology Convention

Yale University faculty
2007 deaths
1921 births
Scientists from New York City
American social psychologists
Fordham University alumni
Université catholique de Louvain alumni
Yale University alumni
Academic journal editors
Fellows of the American Academy of Arts and Sciences
Fellows of the American Psychological Association
20th-century American psychologists
American expatriates in France